Luigi Guido (born 5 March 1968) is an Italian judoka.

He represented Italy at the 1992 Summer Olympics in Barcelona, at the age of 24, in Judo—Men's Half-Heavyweight, and came in tied for 17th.

He represented Italy at the 1996 Summer Olympics in Atlanta in Judo—Men's Half-Heavyweight, at the age of 28, and came in tied for 13th.

He represented Italy at the 2000 Summer Olympics in Sydney in Judo—Men's Half-Heavyweight, and came in tied for 5th.

Achievements

References

1968 births
Living people
Italian male judoka
Judoka at the 2000 Summer Olympics
Olympic judoka of Italy
Judoka at the 1992 Summer Olympics
Judoka at the 1996 Summer Olympics
Mediterranean Games gold medalists for Italy
Mediterranean Games medalists in judo
Competitors at the 1997 Mediterranean Games
Judoka of Centro Sportivo Carabinieri
20th-century Italian people
21st-century Italian people